The Asia Cement Corporation (ACC) is a cement company of Taiwan.

History
ACC was founded on 21 March 1957.

Cement plants
 Hsinchu Plant at Hengshan Township, Hsinchu County
 Hualien Plant at Xincheng Township, Hualien County

Transportation
The company headquarter is accessible within walking distance North West from Liuzhangli Station of Taipei Metro.

See also
 List of companies of Taiwan

References

External links

 

1957 establishments in Taiwan
Cement companies of Taiwan
Manufacturing companies established in 1957
Taiwanese brands